Citrus Park Town Center, previously Westfield Citrus Park, is a shopping mall in Citrus Park, Florida. The anchor stores are Dillard's, JCPenney, Macy's, Regal Cinemas, and Dick's Sporting Goods. There is one vacant anchor store that was once Sears.

History
The mall opened as Citrus Park Town Center on March 3, 1999. Westfield Group acquired the shopping center in May 2002, and renamed it Westfield Shoppingtown Citrus Park, and then Westfield Citrus Park in June 2005. On May 31, 2018, it was announced that Sears would close as part of a plan to close 63 stores nationwide. The store closed on September 2, 2018. In December 2020, Unibail-Rodamco-Westfield surrendered the mall to their lenders, and it was reverted to its previous name.

Anchors 
 Dick's Sporting Goods
 Dillard's (225,785 sq ft)
 JCPenney (127,806 sq ft)
 Macy's (160,000 sq ft) (formerly Burdines since 2005)
 Sears (132,588 sq ft) (Closed in September 2018, to be converted to Elev8 Fun in Fall 2022)

External links

References 

Shopping malls in Florida
Buildings and structures in Hillsborough County, Florida
Tourist attractions in Hillsborough County, Florida
Shopping malls established in 1999
1999 establishments in Florida